Jason Downer (September 9, 1813September 1, 1883) was a justice of the Wisconsin Supreme Court. He was the first editor of the Milwaukee Sentinel when it became a daily in 1844, but quit after a half year, returning to the law. He served on the Wisconsin Supreme Court from 1864 to 1867, when once again he returned to the law.

Biography
Downer was born in Sharon, Vermont. He graduated from Dartmouth College in 1838. Downer moved to Milwaukee, Wisconsin Territory, in 1842. He was one of the founders of the Milwaukee Sentinel and briefly served as its first editor before turning it over to General Rufus King. When Downer died, September 1, 1883, he left an estate worth about $250,000 ($ in  dollars).  He gave away about $150,000 to friends and institutions, and left the rest to his wife, Alcy.  Alcy made a $5,000 donation to the Wisconsin Female College at Fox Lake, on the condition that they name it Downer College, in memory of her husband.  The school eventually became Milwaukee-Downer College and spawned the Milwaukee-Downer Seminary.  Milwaukee-Downer College was ultimately integrated into Lawrence University.

Public service
Downer was appointed to the Wisconsin Supreme Court in 1864 after Justice Byron Paine resigned to enlist in the American Civil War.  In 1865, Downer's appointment was confirmed by a special election, and he won an 8 year term on the court, but he disliked judicial service.  When Paine returned from the war, Justice Downer resigned and returned to private practice.  He briefly returned to the bench in 1869 when he was appointed to fill the last few months of Arthur McArthur's term as Wisconsin Circuit Court Judge for the 2nd Circuit.

References

People from Windsor County, Vermont
Politicians from Milwaukee
Justices of the Wisconsin Supreme Court
Wisconsin lawyers
Editors of Wisconsin newspapers
Dartmouth College alumni
1813 births
1883 deaths
19th-century American journalists
American male journalists
19th-century American male writers
Lawyers from Milwaukee
19th-century American judges
19th-century American lawyers